Omobranchus is a large genus of combtooth blennies found in the Pacific, Atlantic, and Indian oceans.

Species
There are currently 21 recognized species in this genus:
 Omobranchus anolius (Valenciennes, 1836)
 Omobranchus aurosplendidus (J. Richardson, 1846)
 Omobranchus banditus J. L. B. Smith, 1959 (Bandit blenny)
 Omobranchus elegans (Steindachner, 1876)
 Omobranchus elongatus (W. K. H. Peters, 1855) (Cloister blenny)
 Omobranchus fasciolatoceps (J. Richardson, 1846)
 Omobranchus fasciolatus (Valenciennes, 1836) (Arab blenny)
 Omobranchus ferox (Herre, 1927) (Gossamer blenny)
 Omobranchus germaini (Sauvage, 1883) (Germain's blenny)
 Omobranchus hikkaduwensis Bath, 1983
 Omobranchus loxozonus (D. S. Jordan & Starks, 1906)
 Omobranchus mekranensis (Regan, 1905) (Mekran blenny)
 Omobranchus obliquus (Garman, 1903) (Roundhead blenny)
 Omobranchus punctatus (Valenciennes, 1836) (Muzzled blenny)
 Omobranchus robertsi V. G. Springer, 1981
 Omobranchus rotundiceps (W. J. Macleay, 1881)
 Omobranchus smithi (Visweswara Rao, 1974)
 Omobranchus steinitzi V. G. Springer & M. F. Gomon, 1975
 Omobranchus verticalis V. G. Springer & M. F. Gomon, 1975
 Omobranchus woodi (Gilchrist & W. W. Thompson, 1908) (Kappie blenny)
 Omobranchus zebra (Bleeker, 1868)

References

 
Blenniinae
Marine fish genera
Taxa named by Achille Valenciennes